Leptanilloides is a genus of ants in the subfamily Dorylinae. Leptanilloides is an uncommonly collected genus with subterranean habits in the New World Andean and sub-Andean tropics.

Taxonomy
With cryptic and eyeless worker ants, the genus was included in the ant subfamily Cerapachyinae until the establishment of a separate subfamily, Leptanilloidinae, hypothesized as the sister group to the Cerapachyinae and all other members of the dorylomorphs. However, they were synonymized with the previous dorylomorph subfamilies (including the Leptanilloidinae) under Dorylinae.

Species

 Leptanilloides atlantica Silva, Feitosa, Brandão & Freitas, 2013
 Leptanilloides biconstricta Mann, 1923
 Leptanilloides caracola Donoso, Vieira & Wild, 2006
 Leptanilloides erinys Borowiec & Longino, 201
 Leptanilloides femoralis Borowiec & Longino, 2011
 Leptanilloides gracilis Borowiec & Longino, 2011
 Leptanilloides improvisa Brandão, Diniz, Agosti & Delabie, 1999
 Leptanilloides legionaria Brandão, Diniz, Agosti & Delabie, 1999
 Leptanilloides mckennae Longino, 2003
 Leptanilloides nomada Donoso, Vieira & Wild, 2006
 Leptanilloides nubecula Donoso, Vieira & Wild, 2006
 Leptanilloides sculpturata Brandão, Diniz, Agosti & Delabie, 1999

See also
Amyrmex, sister genus of Leptanilloides

References

External links

Dorylinae
Ant genera
Hymenoptera of South America